Filippo Drago (born 24 December 2001) is an Italian rugby union player, currently playing for Italian United Rugby Championship side Benetton. His preferred position is centre.

In June 2021 Drago was named in Italy Under 20 squad for 2021 Six Nations Under 20s Championship''' 
On the 14 October 2021, he was selected by Alessandro Troncon to be part of an Italy A 28-man squad for the 2021 end-of-year rugby union internationals and on 8 December he was named in Emerging Italy 27-man squad also for the 2021 end-of-year rugby union internationals.

References

External links
itsrugby.co.uk Profile

2001 births
Living people
Italian rugby union players
Benetton Rugby players
Mogliano Rugby players
Rugby union centres